Murder in Vienna is a 1956 detective novel by E.C.R. Lorac, the pen name of the British writer Edith Caroline Rivett. It is the forty second in her long-running series featuring Chief Inspector MacDonald of Scotland Yard, one of the more conventional detectives of the Golden Age of Detective Fiction. It has an unusual foreign setting, post-war Vienna still occupied by the Allies, compared to the rest of the series which generally takes place in London or the English countryside. Maurice Richardson reviewing the novel for The Observer described it as the "usual solid job".

Synopsis
While taking a break from his police duties during a holiday to Austria, MacDonald is drawn into an investigation when the English secretary of a retired diplomat is murdered.

References

Bibliography
 Cooper, John & Pike, B.A. Artists in Crime: An Illustrated Survey of Crime Fiction First Edition Dustwrappers, 1920-1970. Scolar Press, 1995.
 Hubin, Allen J. Crime Fiction, 1749-1980: A Comprehensive Bibliography. Garland Publishing, 1984.
 Nichols, Victoria & Thompson, Susan. Silk Stalkings: More Women Write of Murder. Scarecrow Press, 1998.
 Reilly, John M. Twentieth Century Crime & Mystery Writers. Springer, 2015.

1956 British novels
British mystery novels
Novels by E.C.R. Lorac
Novels set in Vienna
British detective novels
Collins Crime Club books